Wootton Top Lock (previously known as Cadley Lock) is a lock on the Kennet and Avon Canal at Wootton Rivers, Wiltshire, England.

The lock has a rise/fall of 8 ft 0 in (2.43 m).

East of this lock is the summit of the canal at 450 ft (137 m) above sea level. Downstream in the same parish are the locks of Brimslade, Heathy Close, and Wootton Rivers Bottom.

It is a Grade II listed structure.

References

See also

Locks on the Kennet and Avon Canal

Locks on the Kennet and Avon Canal
Canals in Wiltshire
Grade II listed buildings in Wiltshire
Grade II listed canals